is a Japanese high school basketball player who attends Veritas National Prep School in Santa Fe Springs, California. He previously attended IMG Academy in Bradenton, Florida.

Early life and career
Tanaka was born in Aomori Prefecture to an American father and a Japanese mother. He briefly lived in Hawaiʻi as a child and was raised in Yokohama, Japan. Tanaka grew up skateboarding but was encouraged by his friends to play basketball due to his height.

High school career 
Tanaka attended Sakamoto Junior High School in Yokosuka and played for the youth team of the Yokohama B-Corsairs. In 2017, he led his team to second place at the B.League Under-15 Championship.

In 2018, Tanaka began attending IMG Academy in Bradenton, Florida, joining one of the best high school teams in the United States. 

In February 2019, he participated in the Basketball Without Borders Global Camp during 2019 NBA All-Star Weekend in Charlotte, North Carolina.

In 2020, Tanaka left IMG due to mental health issues off court and transferred to Kahuku High School in Kahuku, Hawaiʻi. After the season was canceled due to the COVID-19 pandemic, he traveled to Utah where he attended the All-Academic Basketball camp and received an offer from the University of Utah. However, Tanaka lost his roster spot due to the extension given by the NCAA Division I Council to all players for the pandemic-altered season.

In 2021, he transferred to Veritas National Prep School in Santa Fe Springs, California, where he continued his post-graduate.

National team career
In January 2018, Tanaka led the Japanese under-16 team to the title of the Crystal Bohemia Cup in the Czech Republic, earning tournament most valuable player honors. Later that year, he averaged 15.2 points, 4.5 rebounds and 1.7 assists per game for Japan at the FIBA Under-16 Asian Championship. Tanaka was invited to training camp with the Japanese senior national team for the 2019 FIBA Basketball World Cup qualification stage.

References

External links
Chikara Tanaka at the 2017 FIBA Under-16 Asian Championship at fiba.basketball

2002 births
Living people
Japanese men's basketball players
Japanese people of American descent
Point guards
IMG Academy alumni
Sportspeople from Aomori Prefecture
Japanese expatriate basketball people in the United States